Glishades (from the Latin "gilia" meaning "mud", and the Greek "Hades", the mythological lord of the underworld; also meaning "unseen"; together meaning "concealed in mud", referring to being found in sedimentary strata while metaphorically referring to the world beneath the surface where fossils form) is a genus of hadrosauroid dinosaur that lived in the Late Cretaceous in North America. It is based on AMNH 27414, two partial premaxillae discovered in the Upper Cretaceous rocks of the upper Two Medicine Formation in Montana, dated to about 74.5 million years ago. Cladistic analysis conducted by Prieto-Márquez suggests that Glishades is a non-hadrosaurid hadrosauroid, probably a sister taxon to Bactrosaurus johnsoni. The type species is Glishades ericksoni.

According to Campione et al. (2012) the holotype specimen of Glishades ericksoni might actually be an indeterminate juvenile saurolophine hadrosaurid; these authors consider G. ericksoni to be a nomen dubium.

See also

 Timeline of hadrosaur research

References 

Late Cretaceous dinosaurs of North America
Hadrosaurs
Fossil taxa described in 2010
Nomina dubia
Paleontology in Montana
Campanian genus first appearances
Campanian genus extinctions
Ornithischian genera